is a Prefectural Natural Park in central Kyōto Prefecture, Japan. The park flanks the Hozu River within the municipalities of Kameoka and Kyoto (Ukyō-ku).

See also
 National Parks of Japan

References

Parks and gardens in Kyoto Prefecture